Polls leading up to the 2004 Canadian federal election.

Graphical summary

National polls

During the 37th Parliament of Canada

After the creation of the Conservative Party

Before the creation of the Conservative Party

Regional polls

Atlantic Canada

Central Canada

Quebec

During the election campaign

In 2004 (before the election campaign)

In 2003

In 2002

In 2001

Ontario

Prairies

Alberta

British Columbia

Notes

References

External links
http://www.canadawebpages.com/pc-polls.asp

2004 Canadian federal election
2004 general election
Canada